Aguinaldo International School Manila (abbreviation: AIS Manila) is a private school in Paco, Manila, Philippines. It is non-denominational and co-educational, and serves both local and expat families. It is headed by a Canadian superintendent, Mr. Tim Boulton. The school consists of an Early Learning Center, elementary school, and high school. It aspires to become a premier international school in Manila and has taken steps to modernize its facilities & technology and internationalize its curriculum & teaching methods. Past students have been accepted to University of the Philippines, De La Salle University, and University of Santo Tomas. If AIS Manila extends to grade twelve, as it intends to, its graduates will be eligible to apply to top colleges overseas.

History
Aguinaldo International School Manila was first established in June 1999 as Emilio Aguinaldo College Science High School (EAC-SHS); a school for gifted students. The school started with just 11 enrollees and has grown steadily to  its current population of about 215 students. Dr. Mercedes T. Hernandez acted as the first principal of the high school followed by Mrs. Hilaria G. Sus in the second year and Miss Lilian G Alfonso in the third year. EAC-SHS was granted official recognition by the Department of Education on September 20, 2004. From November 2004 to June 2008 Principal Eloisa E Olivera led the school. Engineer Lileth Cuaresma took over as the head teacher in June 2008 and joined with a newly appointed superintendent from New Zealand, Mr. Keith Jones who subsequently renamed the school Aguinaldo International School and began a process of modernizing the facilities and internationalizing the curriculum and teaching. As a result, the school has added some 10 nationalities over the past three years. Mr. Tim Boulton is the school's current superintendent: he was appointed in July 2011 after 8 years at International School Manila where he served as a teacher of high school science.

Organization
The school is affiliated with Emilio Aguinaldo College and it is governed by a 7-member Board of Directors.

Admissions and financial aid
The admissions process includes the submission of records from previous schools, recommendation letters, and test results, as well as an interview with a guidance counselor. AIS also awards merit-based and need-based scholarships each year. Applications for the highly competitive scholarships must be made by mid-March for the school year beginning in July.

Academics
Instruction at AIS Manila is in English and the maximum class size is 15 students. All classes are equipped with computers and overhead projectors, and in 2012 the school started using tablets and e-classrooms in the high school. There is fast WiFi throughout the school as well as Smart Boards.  The foreign languages program includes courses in Filipino and Mandarin Chinese, and the school provides an English as a Second Language (ESL) program. Unlike most other schools in the Philippines, which hold classes from June to March, AIS's school-year runs from early July to early May.

Preschool
AIS Manila operates a preschool for three-, four- and five-year-old children. The school's Early Learning Center (ELC) is an integrated approach to learning based on the principles of a child's physical, social, personal, and mental development. As such the children experience both play-based and classroom-based learning.

Elementary school
The elementary school at AIS Manila is a six-year program for children between the ages of six to eleven.

High school
AIS Manila's high school curriculum integrates the American college-preparatory model with the curriculum requirements of the Philippines Department of Education. This blended approach is intended to give graduating students the option of matriculating at American colleges or local universities. The International Baccalaureate (IB) Diploma is not yet offered but plans are underway to introduce it for school year 2014-2015.

Faculty
AIS hires both host-country and expatriate faculty. The teachers currently come from Canada, New Zealand, Australia and the Philippines. In the 2012-2013 school year there are 20 full-time teachers, 5 part-time teachers, and 1 guidance counselor.

Facilities
AIS Manila occupies the first five floors of Building #1 at Emilio Aguinaldo College in Paco, Manila. The building can accommodate about 400 students, which means AIS can grow for one more year - based on the current growth rate -  before reaching maximum capacity. Construction of a new school building is part of the school's strategic plan. The current facilities include: two air-conditioned gymnasia, a large indoor swimming pool, a fully equipped fitness training room, an indoor soccer court, two canteens, a music room, computer labs, an art room, three science laboratories, a playground, a library containing a total of 44,500 books, a 300-seat capacity auditorium, and a 500-seat Fine Arts Theatre. All rooms, including the classrooms, are air-conditioned.

Safety and security
AIS Manila is located approximately 400m from the Paco Fire Department, 400m from the Manila Police Department and 200m from Medical Center Manila, which is a private and well-equipped hospital. There is an agreement between AIS Manila and Medical Center Manila to ensure that students receive immediate and excellent medical treatment in the event of an emergency. AIS Manila has comprehensive emergency policies for fire, earthquake and other potentialities. The school has one main entrance, two additional emergency exits and two emergency stairwells (at the North and South ends of the school). Multiple security personnel are provided by Emilio Aguinaldo College's security department and at least one security guard is posted at the school's main entrance at all times.

Tuition and fees
Tuition is paid in Philippine pesos. For new students in the 2014-15 school year, the regular school fees are P78,800 in the preschool, P98,800 in the elementary school, and P128,800 in the high school. The school offers "Early Bird Discounts" of P20,000 for preschool and elementary and P30,000 for high school. Additional fees apply to students who require SPED or ESL specialists.

Initiatives
AIS Manila has partnered with Stairway Foundation and Active Aid Partnerships to create an outreach program called "Kids In Action" (KIA). KIA aims to help nearby children who live without proper shelter, safety and/or access to school. At present there are 14 ‘KIA Kids’ in the weekend program and three KIA scholars attending AIS on full scholarship.  These children have potential and each deserves the opportunity to discover his or her natural talents.  They receive meals and medical care, and they participate in art, drama, sports, cooking and field trips. Those that show solid character and academic ability transfer into mainstream classes. In this way, KIA provides highly talented street children with a pathway from street-life to professional-life. KIA believes that all kids have what it takes to become nurses, doctors, teachers, athletes, if only they are given a chance.

KIA aims to help the children become:

healthier through fitness, nutrition and medical and dental care
safer through child rights advocacy and access to social workers
happier through healthy friendships, wholesome activities and participation in outreach projects
smarter through tutorials in English, math and technology
more skilled in interpersonal relationships, decision making, communication, problem-solving, creative thinking, leadership, responsibility, self-awareness, empathy and coping with stress & emotion.

KIA benefits everyone at AIS: it provides AIS students with unique learning experiences to develop responsibility, leadership, compassion and global-mindedness: attributes that top universities & colleges regard highly. More importantly, they begin to see the world through new eyes as they form genuine friendships with the KIA Kids. And they learn to embrace life's challenges as precious opportunities for personal growth and infinite learning.

External links
 
 Emilio Aguinaldo College website
 Stairway Foundation website
 Child Hope Asia - Philippines chapter website

International schools in Manila
Education in Paco, Manila